Dustin Neace (born September 12, 1986) is an American mixed martial artist who fought in Ultimate Fighting Championship and Strikeforce and was a competitor on The Ultimate Fighter: Team Bisping vs. Team Miller. Neace formerly fought in the featherweight division of Bellator.

MMA career

Strikeforce
Neace faced Jeff Curran on November 7, 2009 at Strikeforce: Fedor vs. Rogers. He lost via submission in the first round.

The Ultimate Fighter
In 2011, Neace had signed with the Ultimate Fighting Championship to compete on The Ultimate Fighter: Team Bisping vs. Team Miller. In the first episode, Neace fought Josh Clopton to gain entry into the Ultimate Fighter house. Neace defeated Clopton via unanimous decision (20-18, 20–18, 20–18) after two rounds. Neace was selected as a part of Team Miller, being the third featherweight chosen for the team.

In episodes three through five, Neace was shown multiple times in altercations with Team Bisping fighter, Akira Corassani. The two would later be paired in a bout against each other in the preliminary round. During the fight, inside the first round, Neace applied a heel hook submission that looked like Corassani tapped to; however referee Herb Dean did not stop the fight and Corassani was released from the hold. Corassani went on to defeat Neace via a majority decision after two rounds.

Ultimate Fighting Championship
Neace made his UFC debut on December 3, 2011 at The Ultimate Fighter 14 Finale against his former Ultimate Fighter teammate Bryan Caraway. Neace lost the bout via submission in the second round and was subsequently released from the promotion.

Bellator Fighting Championships
Neace made his Bellator debut on November 16, 2012 at Bellator 81 against Marlon Sandro. Neace lost via technical submission in the first round and was subsequently released from the promotion.

Championships and accomplishments

Mixed martial arts
Coliseum Combat
CC Featherweight Championship (2010,2013)
Conquest Fighting Championships
Conquest FC Featherweight Championship (2012)
Courage Fighting Championships
CFC Featherweight Championship (2008)
King of Kombat (
KOK Featherweight Championship (2008)
Legends of Fighting
LOF Featherweight Championship (2010)
Freestyle Combat Challenge
FCC Four-man Featherweight Tournament Winner (2008)

Mixed martial arts record

|-
|NC
|align=center|25–21–1 (1)
|Kenny Jordan
|NC (Overturned by Indiana Gaming Commission)
|Coliseum Combat 26: Neace vs. Jordan
|
|align=center|4
|align=center|5:00
|Kokomo, Indiana, United States
|
|-
|Loss
|align=center|25–21–1
|Cody Stevens
|Decision (Majority)
|Revelation Fight Organization: Big Guns 12
|
|align=center|3
|align=center|5:00
|Mansfield, Ohio, United States
|
|-
|Win
|align=center|25–20–1
|Bobby Emmons
|Submission (rear naked choke)
|Coliseum Combat 24
|
|align=center|3
|align=center|2:02
|Kokomo, Indiana, United States
|
|-
|Loss
|align=center|24–20–1
|Marlon Sandro
|Technical submission (rear-naked choke)
|Bellator 81
|
|align=center|1
|align=center|2:05
|Kingston, Rhode Island, United States
|
|-
|Win
|align=center|24–19–1
|Peter Dominguez
|Submission (guillotine choke)
|Griggs Entertainment: Conquest FC 1
|
|align=center|1
|align=center|0:16
|Terre Haute, Indiana, United States
|
|-
|Loss
|align=center|23–19–1
|Brian Geraghty
|Decision (split)
|Indy MMA 2
|
|align=center|3
|align=center|5:00
|Indianapolis, Indiana, United States
|
|-
|Loss
|align=center|23–18–1
|Bryan Caraway
|Submission (rear-naked choke)
|The Ultimate Fighter 14 Finale
|
|align=center|2
|align=center|3:38
|Paradise, Nevada, United States
|
|-
|Loss
|align=center|23–17–1
|David Love
|Submission (armbar)
|Colosseum Combat 16
|
|align=center|2
|align=center|3:45
|Kokomo, Indiana, United States
|
|-
|Win
|align=center|23–16–1
|Joel Blanton
|TKO (punches)
|Colosseum Combat 15
|
|align=center|1
|align=center|3:43
|Kokomo, Indiana, United States
|
|-
|Win
|align=center|22–16–1
|Corey Mahon
|KO (punches)
|Legends of Fighting 41: Damage Incorporated
|
|align=center|3
|align=center|4:54
|Indianapolis, Indiana, United States
|
|-
|Loss
|align=center|21–16–1
|João Herdy
|Decision (unanimous)
|Premier Cage Fighting: Total Warrior Challenge 6
|
|align=center|3
|align=center|5:00
|Indianapolis, Indiana, United States
|
|-
|Win
|align=center|21–15–1
|York Ash
|Submission (armbar)
|Legends of Fighting 38
|
|align=center|2
|align=center|1:26
|Indianapolis, Indiana, United States
|
|-
|Win
|align=center|20–15–1
|Anthony Marti
|Submission (rear-naked choke)
|Ruckus Entertainment - Ruckus 2
|
|align=center|1
|align=center|3:53
|Addison, Illinois, United States
|
|-
|Win
|align=center|19–15–1
|Michael Glenn
|Submission (rear-naked choke)
|Legends of Fighting 36
|
|align=center|1
|align=center|2:56
|Indianapolis, Indiana, United States
|
|-
|Loss
|align=center|18–15–1
|Jeff Curran
|Submission (rib injury)
|Strikeforce: Fedor vs. Rogers
|
|align=center|1
|align=center|1:39
|Hoffman Estates, Illinois, United States
|Catchweight (150 lbs) bout.
|-
|Loss
|align=center|18–14–1
|Nick Gonzalez
|TKO (corner stoppage)
|King of Kombat 7 - Judgment Day
|
|align=center|2
|align=center|0:10
|Austin, Texas, United States
|Lost King of Kombat Featherweight Championship.
|-
|Loss
|align=center|18–13–1
|Tommy Hayden
|Submission (rear-naked choke)
|War in the Yard
|
|align=center|2
|align=center|N/A
|Anderson, Indiana, United States
|
|-
|Win
|align=center|18–12–1
|Johnny Bedford
|Submission (kneebar)
|King of Kombat 5: Season's Beatings
|
|align=center|1
|align=center|1:38
|Austin, Texas, United States
|Won King of Kombat Featherweight Championship.
|-
|Loss
|align=center|17–12–1
|Brian Geraghty
|Submission (triangle choke)
|Revolution Fight League: Proving Ground
|
|align=center|3
|align=center|2:15
|Louisville, Kentucky, United States
|
|-
|Loss
|align=center|17–11–1
|Jared McMahan
|Submission (armbar)
|Corral Combat Classic 2
|
|align=center|1
|align=center|0:38
|Hammond, Indiana, United States
|
|-
|Win
|align=center|17–10–1
|Jake Corry
|Submission (rear-naked choke)
|Courage Fighting Championships 10
|
|align=center|1
|align=center|1:30
|Terre Haute, Indiana, United States
|Won CFC Featherweight Championship.
|-
|Loss
|align=center|16–10–1
|Arman Loktev
|TKO (punches)
|NAAFS: Caged Fury 4
|
|align=center|1
|align=center|1:06
|Cleveland, Ohio, United States
|
|-
|Win
|align=center|16–9–1
|Jeremy Ashley
|TKO (punches)
|Freestyle Combat Challenge 32
|
|align=center|1
|align=center|4:59
|Kenosha, Wisconsin, United States
|Won FCC Four-Man Featherweight Tournament.
|-
|Win
|align=center|15–9–1
|Rich Taylor
|Submission (guillotine choke)
|Freestyle Combat Challenge 32
|
|align=center|1
|align=center|N/A
|Kenosha, Wisconsin, United States
|
|-
|Loss
|align=center|14–9–1
|Vadim Ivanov
|Submission (punches)
|NAAFS: Caged Fury 3
|
|align=center|2
|align=center|0:22
|Cleveland, Ohio, United States
|For NAAFS Lightweight Championship.
|-
|Win
|align=center|14–8–1
|Wade Markland
|Submission (rear-naked choke)
|Legends of Fighting 19: Back in Action
|
|align=center|1
|align=center|1:27
|Indianapolis, Indiana, United States
|
|-
|Win
|align=center|13–8–1
|Kirk Birchum
|TKO (punches)
|Legends of Fighting 18: Pole Position
|
|align=center|1
|align=center|1:49
|Indianapolis, Indiana, United States
|
|-
|Win
|align=center|12–8–1
|James Powell
|Submission (verbal)
|Legends of Fighting 16: Heat
|
|align=center|1
|align=center|2:30
|Lafayette, Indiana, United States
|
|-
|Win
|align=center|11–8–1
|David Hampton
|Submission (rear-naked choke)
|Legends of Fighting 15: Vengeance
|
|align=center|1
|align=center|0:17
|Indianapolis, Indiana, United States
|
|-
|Loss
|align=center|10–8–1
|Alonzo Martinez
|Submission (punches)
|Glory FC 1: Genesis
|
|align=center|1
|align=center|1:10
|Des Moines, Iowa, United States
|
|-
|Win
|align=center|10–7–1
|Jack O'Neil
|Submission (choke)
|Legends of Fighting: Revolution 4
|
|align=center|1
|align=center|1:47
|Plainfield, Indiana, United States
|
|-
|Win
|align=center|9–7–1
|John Paun
|Submission (triangle choke)
|Pure Force V: Vendetta
|
|align=center|1
|align=center|1:53
|Tinley Park, Illinois, United States
|
|-
|Loss
|align=center|8–7–1
|Nick Sorg
|Submission (rear-naked choke)
|Legends of Fighting 14: Resurrection
|
|align=center|1
|align=center|1:31
|Indianapolis, Indiana, United States
|
|-
|Loss
|align=center|8–6–1
|Jameel Massouh
|Decision (unanimous)
|Freestyle Combat Challenge 26
|
|align=center|3
|align=center|5:00
|Kenosha, Wisconsin, United States
|
|-
|Draw
|align=center|8–5–1
|Dan Swift
|Draw (majority)
|Legends of Fighting 13: Bad Blood
|
|align=center|3
|align=center|5:00
|Indianapolis, Indiana, United States
|
|-
|Loss
|align=center|8–5
|Raymond Hunter
|Decision (split)
|Freestyle Combat Challenge 25
|
|align=center|3
|align=center|5:00
|Kenosha, Wisconsin, United States
|
|-
|Win
|align=center|8–4
|Tim Bradley
|Submission (guillotine choke)
|Legends of Fighting 12: Black Tie Battles
|
|align=center|1
|align=center|0:17
|Indianapolis, Indiana, United States
|
|-
|Win
|align=center|7–4
|Johnny Bedford
|Submission (armbar)
|Genesis 5
|
|align=center|2
|align=center|0:56
|Findlay, Ohio, United States
|
|-
|Loss
|align=center|6–4
|Mike Bogner
|Submission (guillotine choke)
|Legends of Fighting 10: Unbreakable
|
|align=center|2
|align=center|3:58
|Indianapolis, Indiana, United States
|
|-
|Win
|align=center|6–3
|Tommy Ridenbaugh
|Submission (triangle choke)
|NAAFS: Caged Vengeance 2
|
|align=center|1
|align=center|0:50
|Cleveland, Ohio, United States
|
|-
|Win
|align=center|5–3
|Paul Hayes
|TKO (punches)
|Legends of Fighting 9
|
|align=center|1
|align=center|2:57
|Indianapolis, Indiana, United States
|
|-
|Loss
|align=center|4–3
|Kevin Manderson
|TKO (punches)
|Gladiators Cage Fighting: Colosseum 3
|
|align=center|2
|align=center|1:33
|Winnipeg, Manitoba, Canada
|
|-
|Loss
|align=center|4–2
|Mike Brown
|Submission (guillotine choke)
|Absolute Fighting Championships 18
|
|align=center|1
|align=center|0:50
|Boca Raton, Florida, United States
|
|-
|Win
|align=center|4–1
|Jason Thile
|Submission (armbar)
|Evolution 2
|
|align=center|1
|align=center|1:49
|Greenfield, Indiana, United States
|
|-
|Loss
|align=center|3–1
|Jameel Massouh
|Submission
|Diesel Fighting Championships 1
|
|align=center|3
|align=center|4:50
|Dallas, Texas, United States
|
|-
|Win
|align=center|3–0
|Mike Morgan
|Submission (guillotine choke)
|Legends of Fighting 7: Divide & Conquer
|
|align=center|1
|align=center|N/A
|Marion County, Indiana, United States
|
|-
|Win
|align=center|2–0
|Merritt Warren
|Submission (rear-naked choke)
|HOOKnSHOOT: Live
|
|align=center|1
|align=center|N/A
|Evansville, Indiana, United States
|
|-
|Win
|align=center|1–0
|Eugene Crisler
|Submission (rear-naked choke)
|Madtown Throwdown 7
|
|align=center|N/A
|align=center|N/A
|Madison, Wisconsin, United States
|

References

External links
 
 
 Dustin Neace from UFC Fans

1986 births
Living people
American male mixed martial artists
People from Franklin, Indiana
Mixed martial artists from Indiana
Featherweight mixed martial artists
Lightweight mixed martial artists
Sportspeople from Indianapolis